The Henry Nelson House is a historic home and farm complex located at New Market, Frederick County, Maryland, United States. It is a -story, coursed stone rubble house built about 1800, with a gable roof, and a corbeled brick cornice. Outbuildings include a barn, log springhouse, and a small log house.

The Henry Nelson House was listed on the National Register of Historic Places in 1980.

References

External links
, including photo in 2006, at Maryland Historical Trust

Houses in Frederick County, Maryland
Houses on the National Register of Historic Places in Maryland
National Register of Historic Places in Frederick County, Maryland